Uranium Boom is a 1956 American adventure film directed by William Castle and starring Dennis Morgan and Patricia Medina.

Plot
Becoming mining partners after first getting into a fistfight, two men strike uranium pay dirt in remote Colorado.  Grady (William Talman) guards the claim while Brad (Dennis Morgan) returns to town to register their find.  Unfortunately, Brad is distracted by a young beautiful woman from Denver and quickly marries her, before he realizes she has a past with his partner, who doesn't take the news well.

Vowing to ruin Brad any way he can, Grady begins by giving his half-share of the mine to Jean Williams (Patricia Medina), his former sweetheart, in an attempt to win her back. When that fails, Grady spreads a rumor that the railroad is erecting a spur near the uranium mine. The greed-driven Brad sinks all his money into preparing for the train, then ends up broke when he discovers the truth.

But when he realizes Jean won't leave Brad no matter what, Grady shrugs it off and agrees to become partners with him once again.

Cast 

 Dennis Morgan as Brad Collins
 Patricia Medina as Jean Williams
 William Talman as Grady Mathews
 Tina Carver as Gail Windsor
 Philip Van Zandt as Navajo Charlie
 William Henry as Joe McGinnus
 Gregg Barton as Phil McGinnus
 Mel Curtis as Phil McGinnus
 Henry Rowland as Harry
 S. John Launer as Mac
 Michael Bryant as Peterson
 Frank Wilcox as Floyd Gorman
 Ralph Sanford as Old Timer
 Carlyle Mitchell as Mr. Aldrich
 Nick Tell as Reporter
 Tina Carver as Gail Windsor

Reception
The Los Angeles Times said the cast "prove themselves good troupers in the melodramatic situations."

References

External links 

 
 Turner Classic Movies page
Review of film at Variety

1956 films
Films directed by William Castle
Columbia Pictures films
1956 adventure films
American adventure films
1950s English-language films
1950s American films
American black-and-white films